X 100pre (an abbreviation of "Por siempre" in Spanish, meaning "Forever" and stylized in all caps) is the debut studio album by Puerto Rican rapper Bad Bunny. It was released on December 24, 2018 on Christmas Eve, by Rimas Entertainment. It features guest appearances from Diplo, El Alfa and Drake. It was ranked number 41 on Rolling Stone's list of the 100 Best Debuts Albums of All Time and number 447 on the list of the 500 Greatest Albums of All Time.

Background 
Bad Bunny embarked on his La Nueva Religión Tour Part I and Part II in 2018, which concluded in September. The tour grossed more than $16 million worldwide.

After releasing various singles during 2018, on December 23 he announced via social media that his debut album would be released at midnight on Christmas Eve.

Following the release of the album, Bad Bunny revealed in an Instagram live video that he was not working under his first label Hear this Music and his previous manager DJ Luian because he was not able to release albums under his previous management.

Composition 
X 100pre is primarily a Latin trap and reggaeton album, which also incorporates elements of pop, rock, hip-hop, R&B, bachata, dembow, ballad, acoustic, electronic, house, reggae, dancehall, tropical, cumbia, and salsa.

Promotion

Singles 

"Estamos Bien" was the first single to be released, accompanied by a music video on June 28, 2018. On October 18, 2018, he released the single "Mia" featuring Drake, marking Drake's second song in Spanish.

Following the success of "Mia", Bad Bunny released "Solo de Mí" on December 15, 2018. On January 18, 2019, he released the video of "Caro". Ricky Martin sings backing vocals on the track.

The video of "Si Estuviésemos Juntos" followed on February 14, 2019, and the video of "La Romana", featuring Dominican dembow artist El Alfa, was released on April 6, 2019.

Commercial performance
X 100pre debuted at number 29 on the US Billboard 200, including number 1 on both the Top Latin Albums and Latin Rhythm Albums charts with 30,000 album-equivalent units in its first week. In its second week the album peaked at number 11 on Billboard 200 with 36,000 album-equivalent units.

Critical reception 

At Metacritic, which assigns a normalized rating out of 100 to reviews from mainstream critics, X 100pre received an average score of 84 based on five reviews, indicating "universal acclaim". Alexis Petridis of The Guardian praised Bad Bunny's "off-kilter creativity", opining that Bad Bunny "feels less like part of the current pop landscape than an artist operating slightly adjacent to it. He is separated from the pack as much by a desire to take risks as by his roots." He noted that the record contains a variety of musical genres, including pop punk, Andean music, Dominican dembow and "windswept 80s stadium rock".

Track listing 
All tracks were written by Benito Martínez, except where noted. Credits adapted from Universal Music Publishing Group's catalog.

Notes
 "Ni Bien Ni Mal" and "Mía" are stylized in all caps
 "Caro" features uncredited background vocals by Ricky Martin
"¿Quién Tú Eres?" contains portions and excerpts from Narcos instrumental, written by Ric & Thadeus

Personnel 
Credits adapted from Tidal.
 Noah "40" Shebib – mixing 
 Noel "Gadget" Campbell – mixing 
 Greg Moffett – mixing assistance 
 Chris Athens – mastering 
 David "D.C." Castro – engineering 
 Lindsay Warner – engineering 
 Les "Bates" Bateman – engineering

Charts

Weekly charts

Year-end charts

Certifications

Notes

References 

2018 debut albums
Bad Bunny albums
Albums produced by Tainy
Reggaeton albums
Latin trap albums
Latin pop albums by Puerto Rican artists
Latin Grammy Award for Best Urban Music Album